Malcolm Martin may refer to:

Malcolm Mencer Martin (1920–2010), Austrian-British pediatric endocrinologist
Thelonious Martin (real name Malcolm Martin; born 1992), American record producer

See also
Malcolm W. Martin Memorial Park, a park in East St. Louis, Illinois